Douglas Wright may refer to:

 Douglas E. Wright (born 1955), Canadian horror writer
 Douglas Franklin Wright (1940–1996), first criminal executed by lethal injection in Oregon
 Douglas Wright (dancer) (1956–2018), New Zealand dancer and choreographer
 Douglas Tyndall Wright (1927–2020), Canadian civil engineer
 Douglas S. Wright, former attorney, mayor of Topeka, Kansas and candidate for the United States Congress

See also
Doug Wright (disambiguation)